Taipa was a former island in Macau, presently united with the island of Coloane by reclaimed land known as Cotai. Administratively, the boundaries of the traditional civil parish Freguesia de Nossa Senhora do Carmo are coterminous with that of former Taipa Island.

Geography 
Macau International Airport, University of Macau, Macau Jockey Club and Macau Stadium are all situated in Taipa.
 Area: 
 Population: 70,000+

Most Chinese settlement of Taipa occurred during the Southern Song Dynasty, while the Portuguese occupied the island in 1851. Prior to land reclamation, Taipa consisted of two islands: Greater Taipa and Lesser Taipa.

Central Taipa is a plain as a result of siltation and land reclamation. Initially Taipa was connected to Coloane Island only by the  causeway; but the area called Cotai, built on reclaimed land from 2004 and which is home to mega-resorts, casinos, and convention and exhibition centres, has now connected the two islands into one piece of land. Taipa is connected to peninsular Macau by Governador Nobre de Carvalho Bridge, Friendship Bridge and the Sai Van Bridge.

Taipa is predominantly a growing residential area with many new apartment complexes, mostly up-scale, under construction . As a new town of Macau, Taipa has better city planning than Macau Peninsula; however, many people choose to live in Macau Peninsula since most of the famous schools are located there.

In 2015 the body of the Director General of Macao Customs Service, Lai Minhua, was found in the district.

The names of Taipa 

Both the character  and the alternative form 凼 mean cesspit, but are obsolete in modern Chinese, and only used in relation to Taipa and the Macau-Taipa Bridge ( àodàng dàqiáo). The character 氹, or 凼 (often used in Mainland Chinese texts), is often missing from mobile phone and computer input systems.

Another version according to legend, comes from an exchange between early Portuguese settlers on Taipa and local Chinese settlers. The Portuguese asked the Chinese the name (nome in Portuguese) of the place. The Chinese settlers were local grocery shopkeepers and spoke no Portuguese, but took the Portuguese nome for the Chinese , "sticky rice", which is pronounced similar to nome in Cantonese. Thinking the Portuguese settlers were asking if they sold sticky rice, the Chinese responded with "", pronounced "daai ba" in Cantonese, meaning "a lot." The Portuguese, hearing the response, took this to be the name of the place. There is, however, no historical evidence to support this story. "Taipa" is also what the Portuguese call the clay-mud, rammed into moulds, used to build mud houses in Portugal in times gone by, in recent times referred to as Rammed Earth.

It is also worth noting that, as the great majority of the population in Taipa and Macau is Chinese; however, there is a growing community of expatriates living in Taipa who work at the casinos in Cotai or at the schools and universities. Most people refer to this island by its Cantonese name, "Tamzai", and most taxi drivers and bus drivers will not understand if asked how to go to "Taipa."

Education

Primary and secondary schools 
Public preschool and primary school include:
 Escola Luso-Chinesa da Taipa – Preschool and primary school

Private tuition-free primary and secondary schools:
 Macau Anglican College – Preschool through secondary
 Escola Cáritas de Macau – Special education
 Escola Dom João Paulino – Preschool and primary school
 Fong Chong School of Taipa (Escola Fong Chong da Taipa) – Preschool through senior secondary school
 Hou Kong Middle School Macau Affiliated English School
  Taipa Elementary School Branch
  (Escola Secundária Pui Va) – Preschool through secondary school
  (Escola de Aplicação Anexa à Universidade de Macau) – Preschool through secondary

Private non-free primary and secondary schools:
 The International School of Macao – Located in Block K inside the Macau University of Science and Technology – Preschool through secondary
 School of the Nations (聯國學校; Escola das Nações) – Preschool through secondary with special education

Colleges and universities
Macau University of Science and Technology (MUST), Institute for Tourism Studies, and City University of Macau are located in Taipa. University of Macau (UM), on Hengqin Island, which is part of Taipa (Nossa Senhora do Carmo), but geographically separate from Taipa.

Public libraries
The parish has two public libraries operated by the Macao Public Library system. Taipa Library (Biblioteca da Taipa), which began trial operations on 15 April 2015 and opened officially on 1 September of that year, occupies  of space in the basement of Taipa Central Park (Parque Central da Taipa). Wong Ieng Kuan Library in Taipa (Biblioteca de Wong Ieng Kuan da Taipa) occupies  of space on the second and third floors of Hei Loi Tang Plaza. The library, which had its construction funded with donations from the Wong Ieng Kuan Foundation (Fundação Wong Ieng Kuan), opened in January 2005.

Infrastructures
 Macau Refuse Incineration Plant

Transport
 Macau International Airport
 Taipa Ferry Terminal
 Macau Light Rail Transit

Healthcare
Health centres operated by the Macau government in Taipa include Centro de Saúde dos Jardins do Oceano, Centro de Saúde Nossa Senhora do Carmo-Lago, and Posto de Saúde para os Idosos Taipa.

Other healthcare services include:
 Macau University of Science and Technology Hospital
 Posto de Urgência das Ilhas
 Kiang Wu Hospital Taipa Medical Centre

Tourism 

 Altira Macau
 Cunha Street
 Macau Olympic Aquatic Centre
 Macau Stadium
 Museum of Taipa and Coloane History
 Taipa Houses–Museum
 Macau Jockey Club
 Taipa Fort

Religious
 Pou Tai Un Temple ( or ): named after bodhi tree
 Kun Yam Temple
 Tin Hau Temple
 Sam Po Temple: dedicated to the elder sister of Tin Hau
 Pak Tai Temple: dedicated to the Taoist God of the North
 Four-faced Buddha: invited from Thailand in 1985
 Church of Our Lady of Carmel: Catholic church

See also
 Taipa Ferry Terminal
 List of islands and peninsulas of Macau

References

External links

 Heritage on Taipa
 Satellite image of Taipa by Google Maps

 
Populated coastal places in Macau
Former Portuguese colonies